Opharus morosa is a moth of the family Erebidae. It was described by William Schaus in 1892. It is found in Peru.

References

Opharus
Moths described in 1892
Moths of South America